Erwan Konaté (born 18 April 2003) is a French athlete who specializes in the long jump. He is two times world champion under 20 of the long jump (2021, 2022).

References

External links 

 Erwan Konaté at World Athletics
 

Living people
2003 births
French male long jumpers
World Athletics U20 Championships winners